Jean-Baptiste Bédard may refer to:
 Jean-Baptiste Bédard (politician) (1763–1815), politician in Lower Canada
 Jean-Baptiste Bédard (carpenter) (1761–1818), carpenter and surveyor in Lower Canada